The 2016 Conference USA women's basketball tournament was a postseason women's basketball tournament for Conference USA was held March 8–12 in Birmingham, Alabama. The first two rounds took place at Bartow Arena while the semifinals and championship were held at Legacy Arena. Middle Tennessee won their second C-USA title and earn an automatic trip to the NCAA women's tournament.

Seeds
The top fourteen teams qualified for the tournament. Teams were seeded by record within the conference, with a tiebreaker system to seed teams with identical conference records.

Schedule

Bracket
 

All times listed are Central

See also
2016 Conference USA men's basketball tournament

References

Conference USA women's basketball tournament
Conference USA women's basketball tournament
Tournament
Conference USA women's basketball tournament